Pots most commonly refers to pottery, the ceramic ware made by potters

POTS or Pots may also refer to:
 Plain old telephone service, basic wireline telecommunication connection
 POTS codec, a digital audio device
 DSL filter, also known as a POTS filter
 Packet-Optical Transport System, a means of optical transport for 100 Gigabit Ethernet that is agnostic and converged with respect to lower layers
 Postural orthostatic tachycardia syndrome, a medical condition
 Poverty of the stimulus, an argument in favor of innate grammar

See also 

 Pot (disambiguation)